The 2022–23 Western Illinois Leathernecks men's basketball team represented Western Illinois University in the 2022–23 NCAA Division I men's basketball season. The Leathernecks, led by third-year head coach Rob Jeter, played their home games at Western Hall in Macomb, Illinois, as members of the Summit League.

Previous season
The Leathernecks finished the 2021–22 season 16–16, 7–11 in Summit League play to finish in a tie for sixth place. In the Summit League tournament, they were defeated by Oral Roberts in the first round. They received an invitation to The Basketball Classic, where they lost to UTEP in the first round.

Roster

Schedule and results

|-
!colspan=12 style=| Exhibition

|-
!colspan=12 style=| Non-conference regular season

|-
!colspan=12 style=| Summit League regular season

|-
!colspan=9 style=|Summit League tournament

Sources

References

Western Illinois Leathernecks men's basketball seasons
Western Illinois Leathernecks
Western Illinois Leathernecks men's basketball
Western Illinois Leathernecks men's basketball